Garrick's catshark (Apristurus garricki) is a species of shark in the family Scyliorhinidae found in the waters of New Zealand. Its natural habitat is the open seas. The new deep-water catshark, Apristurus garricki, is described from the waters of northern New Zealand. It is named in honour of Jack Garrick.

Conservation status 
The IUCN Red List classifies the Garrick's catshark as being of least concern.

The New Zealand Department of Conservation has classified the Garrick's catshark as "Data deficient" under the New Zealand Threat Classification System.

References

Garrick's catshark
Endemic marine fish of New Zealand
Taxa named by Keiichi Sato (ichthyologist)
Taxa named by Andrew L. Stewart
Taxa named by Kazuhiro Nakaya
Garrick's catshark